Jorge Damián Rodríguez Larraura (born January 24, 1977 in Montevideo, Uruguay) is a Uruguayan footballer who plays as a goalkeeper for Villa Teresa in the Uruguayan Segunda División.

Teams
  Progreso 1994-1996
  Basañez 1997
  Progreso 1998
  Unión San Felipe 1999
  Juventud de Las Piedras 2000
  Guaraní 2000
  Unión Española 2001
  Cobresal 2002-2003
  Paysandú Bella Vista 2003
  Tacuarembó 2004
  Progreso 2004
  Tiro Federal 2005
  Tacuarembó 2005
  Uruguay Montevideo 2006
  Nacional 2006
  Racing de Montevideo 2007
  FBC Melgar 2007-2010
  Progreso 2011-2013
  Villa Teresa 2013-

References
 Profile at BDFA 

1977 births
Living people
Uruguayan footballers
Uruguayan expatriate footballers
Racing Club de Montevideo players
Juventud de Las Piedras players
Tacuarembó F.C. players
C.A. Progreso players
FBC Melgar footballers
Uruguay Montevideo players
Club Nacional footballers
Club Guaraní players
Tiro Federal footballers
Cobresal footballers
Unión San Felipe footballers
Unión Española footballers
Expatriate footballers in Chile
Expatriate footballers in Argentina
Expatriate footballers in Paraguay
Expatriate footballers in Peru

Association football goalkeepers